Clara Faragó (née Friedmann, 6 October 1905 – November 1944) was a Hungarian chess master. She was Women's World Chess Championship participant (1937).

Biography
She was born in a large family who has moved to Hungary from Transylvania. She a year learned in the University of Graz, then graduated from the Faculty of Law in University of Budapest and worked at the Hungarian Road Department.

In the 1920s and 1930s, Clara Faragó was one of the leading female chess players in the Hungary. She was a member of Budapest Chess Club and Hungarian chess master Árpád Vajda schoolgirl. In the 2nd Unofficial Chess Olympiad women's tournament she won 4th place in the competition of eight participants. In 1936 she took 10th place in the International Women's Chess tournament in Semmering. In October 1936, she played a match with the Austrian chess master Gisela Harum and lost 1:3. In 1937, Clara Faragó participated in Women's World Chess Championship in Stockholm where shared 10th-16th place.

She died during World War II.

References

1905 births
1944 deaths
Hungarian female chess players
Eötvös Loránd University alumni
20th-century chess players
Hungarian civilians killed in World War II